Al Hazm'  is an airstrip serving the town of Al Hazm in Yemen.

See also
Transport in Yemen

References

 OurAirports - Yemen
   Great Circle Mapper - Al Hazm
 Al Hazm
 Google Earth

Airports in Yemen